Eggert Jóhannesson was an Icelandic football manager and former player. He managed the Icelandic national team in 1972.

Honours - Manager
Víkingur
Icelandic Cup: 1971

References

Eggert Johannesson
Eggert Johannesson
Eggert Johannesson
Association footballers not categorized by position
Year of birth missing
Eggert Jóhannesson
Eggert Jóhannesson]son